Shyam Prabhakar Mardikar (born 23 March 1971) is The Group  Chief Technology Officer - Mobility at Reliance Jio Infocomm Limited (India), an Indian multinational telecommunications services company, headquartered in [ Navi Mumbai, Maharashtra], India, it operates a national LTE network with coverage across all 22 telecom circles. Jio does not offer 2G or 3G service, and instead uses voice over LTE to provide voice service on its network.

Personal background 
Shyam Prabhakar Mardikar was born on 23 March 1971 in Jabalpur. Shyam attended various schools in Madhya Pradesh including Holy Cross Convent in Raipur, Miss Hill School in Gwalior and St Xavier's in Surguja (now Chhattisgarh). He received his Bachelors in Telecommunications Engineering from Jabalpur Engineering College in Jabalpur, Madhya Pradesh.

Career
Shyam started his career in 1994 with C-DOT as a software research engineer and held various operational and management positions in Airtel. He also served as Deputy General Manager in Department of Telecommunications, India.
He was also a member of GSMA's executive management committee.
While talking about managed services for telecom sector in his first stint at airtel, Shyam was quoted saying, "Telecom sells like fish" but the operators have found that it is more cost beneficial to employ fishermen to catch the fish and for them to focus on marketing it.

Shyam moved out of Airtel later in 2010 and joined Lebara group as The Chief Technology Officer. He was based out of London; where he was responsible for implementation & execution of the Company's technology strategy and aligning the Technology Vision with the Business Strategy across its 7 countries.

Shyam has held many key roles in Airtel, his latest one being the Chief - Strategy, Architecture and Engineering at Airtel.
In this role, Shyam was instrumental for transforming the network architecture to a next generation, mobile broad band enabled, data services centric network. He was also instrumental in driving the overall strategy on the technology standards across different domains to ensure sustaining Airtel's leadership position on the technology front and set the benchmark standards for the industry.

In his current role at Bharti Airtel, Shyam is The Chief Technology Officer of Mobile Networks.

Along with his existing role at Bharti Airtel, Shyam currently chairs the technology committee of Cellular Operators Association of India

Publications 
The 3 Vs

Telecom Summit Presence 
VAS ASIA 2014 
LTE INDIA 2014 
TD-LTE Summit 2013 
4G World India Expo & Conference 
Broadband Tech India 2013 
VAS Asia 2013 
VAS India 2010 
23rd Convergence India 2015 Expo 
Vision 4G LTE Telecom Conclave 
LTE India 2015

References 

Living people
1971 births
People from Jabalpur
Bharti Airtel